Naktichya Lagnala Yayach Ha is an Indian Marathi language comedy show which aired on Zee Marathi. It starred Prajakta Mali in lead role.

Cast 
 Prajakta Mali as Nupur Suryakant Deshpande
 Abhijeet Aamkar as Neeraj Jayant Divate
 Pournima Talwalkar as Vijaya Suryakant Deshpande
 Sanjay Sugaonkar as Suryakant Deshpande
 Varsha Dandale as Lata Chandrakant Deshpande 
 Asit Redij / Atul Todankar as Chandrakant Deshpande
 Abhinay Sawant as Yash Chandrakant Deshpande
 Ragini Samant as Aaisaheb
 Shakuntala Nare as Baisaheb
 Ananda Karekar as Jayant Divate
 Sonali Pandit as Shailaja Jayant Divate

Guest Appearances 
 Shashank Ketkar
 Aniket Vishwasrao
 Prasad Oak
 Swapnil Joshi
 Avadhoot Gupte
 Siddharth Chandekar
 Bharat Jadhav
 Siddharth Menon
 Vaibhav Mangle
 Subodh Bhave
 Hrishikesh Joshi
 Gashmeer Mahajani
 Nilesh Sabale
 Lalit Prabhakar
 Sushant Shelar
 Sandip Pathak
 Sagar Karande
 Anand Ingale
 Milind Shinde
 Prashant Damle
 Bhalchandra Kadam
 Uday Tikekar
 Mohan Joshi
 Kavita Lad
 Shilpa Tulaskar
 Nirmiti Sawant
 Kranti Redkar
 Seema Deshmukh
 Mugdha Godbole
 Radhika Harshe

References

External links 
 
 Naktichya Lagnala Yayach Ha at ZEE5
 
Marathi-language television shows
2017 Indian television series debuts
Zee Marathi original programming
2017 Indian television series endings